Logan Mitchell (1802–1881) was a British freethinker and writer.

Mitchell is best known for his book The Christian Mythology Unveiled. Mitchell committed suicide in November 1881. He left a large sum of money for any bookseller to publish his book. It was printed several times under different titles, most notably by the Freethought Publishing Company in 1881.

Mitchell was an advocate of the Christ myth theory. His views have been compared to Robert Taylor's.

Quote
Jesus Christ in the New Testament, has no reference whatever to any event that ever did in reality take place upon this globe; or to any personages that ever in truth existed: and that the whole is an astronomical allegory, or parable, having invariably a primary and sacred allusion to the sun, and his passage through the signs of the zodiac; or a verbal representation of the phenomena of the solar year and seasons.

Publications

Religion in the Heavens; Or, Mythology Unveiled (London: Freethought Publishing Company, 1881)
The Christian Mythology Unveiled (printed privately for the author, 1882)

See also

Myles McSweeney
Richard Carlile

References

1802 births
1881 deaths
Christ myth theory proponents
Freethought writers
Suicides in England
1880s suicides